Andriy Vasylyuk (born 29 August 1987) is a Ukrainian racing cyclist, who most recently rode for UCI Continental team . He rode at the 2014 UCI Road World Championships.

Major results

2005
 9th Time trial, UCI Juniors World Championships
2010
 3rd Time trial, National Road Championships
2011
 4th Overall Okolo Slovenska
 7th Overall Grand Prix of Sochi
 10th Overall Five Rings of Moscow
2012
 9th Overall Five Rings of Moscow
 10th Grand Prix of Donetsk
 10th Memorial Oleg Dyachenko
 10th Grand Prix of Moscow
2013
 1st  Time trial, National Road Championships
 1st Prologue Five Rings of Moscow
 5th Overall Grand Prix of Sochi
 6th Overall Tour of Romania
1st Prologue (TTT)
 10th Overall Grand Prix of Adygeya
 10th Overall Baltic Chain Tour
2014
 1st  Time trial, National Road Championships
 6th Overall Grand Prix of Adygeya
 8th Overall Tour of Szeklerland
 10th Overall Baltic Chain Tour
2015
 1st  Overall Podlasie Tour
 3rd Time trial, National Road Championships
 7th Overall Tour of Qinghai Lake
 7th Horizon Park Race for Peace
 9th Overall Tour of Mersin
2016
 1st  Time trial, National Road Championships
 1st Tour de Ribas
 2nd Overall Baltic Chain Tour
 5th Overall Tour of Qinghai Lake
1st Stage 12 (ITT)
 5th Odessa Grand Prix
 8th Belgrade–Banja Luka I
 10th Overall Tour of Ukraine
1st Stage 2a (TTT)
2017
 1st  Mountains classification Czech Cycling Tour
 National Road Championships
2nd Time trial
4th Road race
 2nd Overall Tour of Ukraine
1st Stage 2 (TTT)
 2nd Tour de Ribas
 3rd Overall Tour of Bulgaria South
 4th Odessa Grand Prix
 5th Overall Tour of Taihu Lake
 5th Overall Tour d'Azerbaïdjan
 7th Overall Tour of Fuzhou
 8th Overall Tour of Bulgaria North
 8th Overall Tour of Xingtai
 8th Overall Okolo Slovenska
 8th Overall Szlakiem Walk Majora Hubala
2018
 6th GP Czech Republic
 8th Overall Baltic Chain Tour
2019
 1st Chabany Race
 1st Race Horizon Park Classic
 2nd Time trial, National Road Championships
 4th Horizon Park Race for Peace
 5th Odessa Grand Prix
2020
 3rd Time trial, National Road Championships
 3rd Grand Prix Develi
 3rd Grand Prix World's Best High Altitude
 5th Grand Prix Velo Erciyes
 6th Grand Prix Mount Erciyes
 6th Grand Prix Central Anatolia

References

External links

1987 births
Living people
Ukrainian male cyclists
Sportspeople from Nizhyn
European Games competitors for Ukraine
Cyclists at the 2015 European Games
Cyclists at the 2019 European Games